Former Mountain View, California Mayor Rosemary Stasek (August 10, 1963 – September 24, 2009) died in Kabul, Afghanistan of a heart attack possibly due to complications from multiple sclerosis. After the U.S. invasion of Afghanistan, she dedicated her life to the girls and women there.

Career
Rosemary Stasek was elected to the Mountain View, California City Council in 1996 and re-elected in 2000. She was elected by the Council to serve as the city's Mayor in 2000.  During her time in office she also chaired the Council's Technology Committee.  Stasek represented Mountain View on the CalTrain Policy Advisory Board and the Santa Clara County Emergency Preparedness Council. These two organizations oversaw and addressed issues of Homeland Security in the US.

Personal information
Stasek was born and raised in Northeast Pennsylvania.

Education
Rosemary graduated from Cornell University where she obtained a Bachelor's degree in Economics. She made the Dean's List as a student and was the manager of the football and wrestling teams.

Additional information
Stasek was also an award-winning food preserver. She taught classes on food preservation which included: making jams, jellies and pickles. In 2004, Stasek traveled to Afghanistan to teach Afghan women how to preserve food and generate revenue from home-based businesses.

External links
 Family site biography
 September 28, 2009 Mountain View Voice
 October 27, 2009  Mountain View Voice
 San Francisco magazine

References

1963 births
2009 deaths